Alexander Nevsky Cemetery may refer to:
 any cemetery related to St Alexander Nevsky Monastery, Sankt Petersburg, Russia
 Alexander Nevsky Cemetery, Tallinn, cemetery in Tallinn, Estonia